is a traditional slub-woven silk fabric from Japan. It is a tabby weave material woven from yarn produced using silk noil, short-staple silk fibre (as opposed to material produced using longer, filament silk fibres). The short silk fibres are degummed and, traditionally, the yarns are hand-joined to form a continuous length before weaving, a technique also used for cheaper bast fibres. Yarns are joined by twisting the ends to be joined in the same direction, then twisting both ends, bundled together, in the other direction, to make a two-ply yarn at the overlap. It might alternately be loosely handspun, with few twists per unit length. Because of this structure,  is rough-surfaced, soft and drapey, softening further with age.

Between 1910 to 1925 (late Taishō to Shōwa era), it became common to spin as well as weave silk noil by machine (see  for the technological developments that made this possible). This machine-spun  cloth largely displaced  as one of the cheapest silk fabrics. Prices dropped drastically, and silk materials and clothing was suddenly within the budget of most Japanese; stores also began to sell off-the-peg, ready-to-wear kimono at about this time.

Originally,  was homemade from domestic or wild-gathered silkworm cocoons that had been broken by hatching or were irregularly formed. Unlike the long-fiber silk, such cloth was permitted to peasants. Traditionally a peasant cloth, handmade  is very labour-intensive to produce, and has become expensive over time, valued as a luxury folk-craft.

Recognized regional varieties
 was originally a homespun textile, produced using silk fibre deemed unusable for the production of finer fabrics, and many regional variations existed.

See also
Dupioni
Pongee
Shantung

References

Japanese weaving techniques
Textiles
Sericulture